Pentagón Jr. (born February 5, 1985) is a Mexican luchador enmascarado (masked professional wrestler) signed to All Elite Wrestling (AEW) under the ring name Penta El Zero Miedo ("Penta Zero Fear"). He is a former AEW World Trios Champion with his Death Triangle stablemates Pac and his real-life younger brother, Rey Fénix. Penta and Fénix also team as the Lucha Brothers and are former one-time AEW World Tag Team Champions. He also appears in Lucha Libre AAA Worldwide (AAA), where he is a former AAA World Tag Team Champion, also with Fénix.

He is also known for his work with Impact Wrestling where he is a one-time Impact World Champion and one-time Impact World Tag Team Champion, and Major League Wrestling (MLW) where he is a one-time MLW World Tag Team Champion. He also wrestles for Mexico's Consejo Mundial de Lucha Libre (CMLL) and The Crash as Penta El 0M ("0M" standing for "Cero Miedo", Spanish for "Zero Fear") and for American television show Lucha Underground (as Pentagón Dark) where he is a former two-time Lucha Underground Champion. He also competes on the U.S. independent circuit, notably for Pro Wrestling Guerrilla (PWG) and AAW. With PWG he is a former one-time PWG World Tag Team Champion.

Pentagón Jr. initially became known for his tenure with AAA between 2010 and 2017, where he is a former Latin American Champion, Mixed Tag Team Champion, World Tag Team Championship and the 2016 Rey de Reyes. In January 2017, he left AAA and announced that he was working for The Crash and formed a group called La Rebelión ("The Rebellion") with other former AAA wrestlers. By mid-2018 it was announced that AAA and Pentagón Jr. had come to an agreement to work together again.

His real name is not a matter of public record, as is often the case with masked wrestlers in Mexico, where their private lives are kept a secret from the wrestling fans.

Early life 
The future Pentagón Jr. was born on February 5, 1985, in Xalapa, Veracruz, Mexico.  It is unclear exactly how many brothers and sisters he has, but two younger brothers have also become professional wrestlers, best known under the ring names Rey Fénix, and Ikaro.

Professional wrestling career

Early career 
As the man behind the Pentagón Jr. mask has never been unmasked in the ring not much is known about his previous history beyond what has been revealed by the man himself, which is traditional in Lucha libre. According to Pentagón Jr. he was trained by Skayde, and made his debut in 2007, working as the masked character "Zaius". His first verified match was on April 9, 2008, where Zaius teamed up with Black Star, losing to his brothers who wrestled as the masked characters Máscara Oriental and El Niño de Fuego. He would win his first ever championship on July 26, 2009, when he defeated Mesalla to win the WCW Intercontinental Championship in a Luchas de Apuestas ("bet match") where Zaius put his mask on the line. Records are unclear on if or when he lost the championship.

Lucha Libre AAA Worldwide (2010–2017) 

Still working as Zaius the future Pentagón Jr. worked a dark match try out for AAA on September 9, 2010, teaming with Pesadilla to defeat the team of Konami and Máscara Oriental. In 2011 he began working for AAA on a regular basis, using the name "Dark Dragon", while also working on the independent circuit as Zaius. As Dark Dragon he joined AAA's mid-level rudo group La Milicia. At the same time as he was given the "Dark Dragon" persona his brother then known as Máscara Oriental, was given a new name and mask, becoming known as Fénix.

On December 2, 2012, the Dark Dragon persona was abandoned and AAA reintroduced him as Pentagón Jr. at their major year-end show Guerra de Titanes ("War of the Titans"). He was introduced as the arch-enemy of the newly introduced Octagón Jr., just like the original Pentagón had been the storyline arch-enemy of Octagón. Octagón, Octagón Jr. and La Parka defeated Pentagón Jr., La Parka Negra and Silver Cain. Since several wrestler who held the name Pentagon had bad luck in their careers, there is the legend of the name Pentagon being cursed. Pentagón Jr.'s catchphrase, Cero Miedo (Zero Fear) was created to show no fear to the curse.  By mid-2013 Octagón Jr. left AAA, leaving Pentagón Jr. without any direction or storyline. On August 18 at Héroes Inmortales VII, Pentagón entered the 2013 Copa Antonio Peña, but was defeated in the first round by El Hijo del Fantasma. On March 16, 2014, at AAA's Rey de Reyes show, Pentagón Jr. participated in an eight-man Lucha de Apuestas Domo de la Muerte ("Dome of Death" bet match), but escaped the cage before the end, keeping his mask safe. At Triplemanía XXII, held on August 17, Pentagón Jr participated in a unification match for both the AAA Fusión Championship and AAA Cruiserweight Championship in a multi-man match that was won by El Hijo del Fantasma. On November 17, Pentagón Jr. joined the Los Perros del Mal stable. On December 7, Pentagón Jr. and his new stablemate Joe Líder won the AAA World Tag Team Championship by defeating Los Güeros del Cielo (Angélico and Jack Evans) and Myzteziz and Fénix in a three-way match. They lost the title back to Angélico and Evans on October 4, 2015, at Héroes Inmortales IX.

On March 23, 2016, Pentagón Jr. won the 2016 Rey de Reyes tournament by defeating La Parka and Villano IV. The Rey de Reyes victory was used to build him up as a challenger for the AAA Latin American Championship, which culminated with Pentagón Jr. defeating then-champion Psycho Clown on July 3. At Triplemanía XXIV, on August 28, Pentagón Jr. lost the championship to Johnny Mundo. Pentagón later lost a rematch to Mundo on January 20, 2017 at the Guerra de Titanes. The following day, Pentagón announced that he no longer worked for AAA, citing unhappiness from feeling restricted and held back by AAA.

Lucha Underground (2014–2018) 
In August 2014, Pentagón was announced as one of five AAA wrestlers to star in Lucha Underground, a new American television series on El Rey. Pentagón debuted on the third episode on November 12, where he was defeated by his brother, Fénix, in a three-way, that also included Drago. Over the next weeks, the two real-life brothers developed a storyline rivalry between them. On February 4, 2015, Pentagón started a storyline about him breaking his opponent's arms; dedicating each broken arm as a sacrifice for his unknown master. On April 1, 2015, Pentagon participated in a tournament to crown the first LU Trios Champions. Pentagon, Sexy Star and Super Fly were defeated by Big Ryck, The Mack and Killshot. After the match, Pentagon attempted to break Super Fly's arm, but Star saved him. On April 8, 2015, Pentagon attacked Star and Super Fly, managing to break Super Fly's arm. On April 22, 2015, Pentagón was defeated by Sexy Star. On June 3, 2015, Pentagon defeated Sexy Star in a submission match. After the match, Pentagon attempted to sacrifice Sexy Star but was stopped by commentator Vampiro. Afterwards, Pentagón began attacking Vampiro, saying he would sacrifice him for his master. During Ultima Lucha on August 5, 2015, Pentagón Jr. defeated Vampiro in a violent Cero Miedo match. After the match, at Vampiro's urging, Pentagón Jr. broke Vampiro's arm. Vampiro then revealed he was Pentagón Jr.'s master.

On the season two premiere on January 27, Pentagón attacked reigning Lucha Underground Champion, Mil Muertes following his successful defense against Ivelisse and broke Muertes' arm, turning face in the process. Pentagón unsuccessfully challenged for the Lucha Underground Championship against Matanza Cueto, the story-line monster heel brother of authority figure Dario Cueto in 2015. This match aired via tape delay on March 30, 2016. At Ultima Lucha Dos on January 31, 2016, Pentagón took on the name "Pentagón Dark" after receiving further "training" from Vampiro in an attempt to once again challenge Matanza Cueto for the Lucha Underground Championship. After his bid to capture the title failed, he turned on Vampiro.

At Aztec Warfare III Pentagón was attacked by Black Lotus (who swore revenge on Pentagón for breaking her arm at Ultima Lucha Dos) along with Members of The Black Lotus Triad Hitokiri, Doku and Yurei and was eliminated by Johnny Mundo. Two weeks later he faced the Black Lotus triad members in a gauntlet match in a losing effort and got his arm broken by Black Lotus and El Dragon Azteca Jr, who also swore revenge on Pentagón for breaking his arm. On June 25 at Ultima Lucha Tres, Pentagón Dark defeated Son of Havoc in a ladder match to win the vacant Gift of the Gods Championship, which also earned him a future shot at the Lucha Underground Championship. He cashed in his shot the following day and defeated Prince Puma in a "Loser Must Retire" match to become the new Lucha Underground Champion.

On June 13, 2018, Lucha Underground aired the first episode of the 4th season. At the first episode, Pentagón Dark won the Aztec Warfare to retain the title. Becoming the first person to ever do so.

Pro Wrestling Guerrilla (2015–2019) 
On August 28, 2015, Pentagón Jr. made his debut for Pro Wrestling Guerrilla (PWG) by entering the 2015 Battle of Los Angeles tournament, defeating Drago in his first round match. He was eliminated from the tournament in his second round match two days later by eventual tournament winner Zack Sabre Jr. On September 2, 2016, Pentagón Jr. returned to PWG, entering the 2016 Battle of Los Angeles, from which he was eliminated in the first round by Marty Scurll. Two days later, Pentagón Jr. and Fénix unsuccessfully challenged The Young Bucks (Matt Jackson and Nick Jackson) for the PWG World Tag Team Championship.

On March 18, 2017, Penta el 0M and Rey Fénix defeated The Young Bucks and the team of Matt Sydal and Ricochet in a three-way match to win the PWG World Tag Team Championship. On October 20, Penta and Fénix were booked to lose the championship to The Chosen Bros (Jeff Cobb and Matt Riddle), ending their reign at 216 days.

Independent circuit (2015–2019) 
With the debut of Lucha Underground on American television, Pentagón Jr. began getting work on the US independent circuit, working for various promotions when his AAA schedule would allow it. He began working for a variety of promotions in Latin America and the United States.

On July 23, 2016, Pentagón Jr. defeated Sami Callihan to win AAW: Professional Wrestling Redefined's Heavyweight Championship. On October 8, 2016, Pentagón Jr. put the championship on the line in a Lucha de Apuestas tag team match where his brother Fénix put his mask on the line, while their opponent risked either their hair (Callihan) or their career (Jake Crist). The match ended when Callihan pinned Pentagón Jr. to regain the championship.

During a January 21, 2017, show for The Crash Lucha Libre promotion, Pentagón Jr., Daga and Garza Jr. all came to the ring and later confirmed that they had left AAA. Since AAA owned the trademark to the name Pentagón Jr., he revealed that he would be known as "Penta el 0M" ("Cero Miedo", "Zero Fear"). The three hoped to able to use the Perros del Mal name on the independent circuit, but were unable to obtain the right and on January 24, Penta announced he was leaving Perros del Mal. On January 27, Penta, Daga, Garza and Fénix el Rey announced the formation of a new stable in The Crash, named La Rebelión ("The Rebellion").

On September 1, 2018, Penta El Zero lost to Kenny Omega at the independent wrestling super show All In. Following the match, the lights went dark and when they came on Chris Jericho, dressed as Pentagon, attacked Omega before removing his mask to reveal himself.

Major League Wrestling (2018–2019) 
Penta 0M made his debut for the U.S. based Major League Wrestling (MLW) on January 11, 2018, where he defeated his brother Rey  Fénix as part of MLW's "Zero Hour" show. This would be taped for the April 20, 2018 debut episode of MLW Fusion on BeIN Sports. He would later earn a match for Shane Strickland's MLW World Heavyweight Championship, but lost the match. The following month Los Lucha Bros (Pentagon and Fenix) defeated "Team TBD" (Jason Cade and Jimmy Yuta) and The Dirty Blondes (Leo Brien and Mike Patrick) to become the first holders of the MLW World Tag Team Championship in the restarted MLW. The long-running rivalry between Penta 0M and L.A. Park also became part of the storyline in MLW, leading to L.A. Park defeating Pentagon in a "Mexican Massacre" No disqualification match on September 9, 2018. The Mexican Massacre match would later be selected as the "MLW Match of the Year" for 2018.  At MLW Fightland, held on November 8, 2018, Los Lucha Bros successfully defended the MLW World Tag Team Championship against L.A. Park and his son El Hijo de L.A. Park.

Following his feud with Park, Lucha Bros begun feuding with The Hart Foundation (Teddy Hart, Davey Boy Smith Jr. and Brian Pillman Jr.) over the MLW Tag Team Championship. On the January 4, 2019 episode of MLW Fusion Pentagon lost to Teddy Hart The team would hold the titles until February 2, 2019, when they lost the MLW Tag Team Championship to The Hart Foundation (Teddy Hart and Davey Boy Smith Jr.). Penta and Fenix appeared at MLW's next event, Intimidation Games, which took place on March 2, 2019.

Impact Wrestling (2018–2019) 
Pentagón Jr. debuted with Impact Wrestling on an "Impact Wrestling vs Lucha Underground" co-promoted event at WrestleCon 2018, winning a three-way match against Fénix and Impact World champion Austin Aries. It was subsequently announced that Pentagón Jr. would face Fénix in a single's match at Impact's Redemption Pay-Per-View event. However, following Alberto El Patron's dismissal from the promotion, Pentagón Jr. and Fénix were announced as his replacement in the main event, this time for the Impact World Championship. Pentagón Jr. was booked to win the match, claiming the Impact World Championship. During the Impact Wrestling television taping the next day Pentagón Jr. successfully defended the championship against Eli Drake and then Jimmy Jacobs, followed by losing the championship to Austin Aries the following night to end Impact Wrestling's television tapings for the week. The match for the championship was aired on US television as part of the Under Pressure special episode on May 31.

On June 3, Pentagón Jr. headlined an Impact Wrestling "One Night Only" special show called Zero Fear (name after Pentagón Jr. catchphrase), where he defeated Eli Drake and Moose. In the Spring and Summer of 2018, Pentagón Jr entered a feud with Sami Callihan whom he has faced numerous occasions across many promotions both on and off television. The feud was built up over several Impact broadcasts and was designed to culminate in a match at IW's Slammiversary PPV. The stipulation for the match ended up becoming a "mask Vs hair" match after Callihan attempted to remove Pentagón Jr.'s mask after attacking him with a baseball bat. At Slammiversary, Pentagón Jr defeated Callihan, and proceeded to shave Callihan's hair as per the stipulations of the match. On January 12, 2019, Pentagón and Fénix defeated the Latin American Xchange (LAX) during the TV tapings in Mexico to win the Impact World Tag Team Championship. At Rebellion. They lost the titles back to LAX in a Full Metal Mayhem match.

Return to AAA (2018–present) 
On June 5, 2018, it was announced that Pentagón Jr. was returning to AAA, participating in AAA's Poker de Ases ("Poker Aces") match at Triplemanía XXVI, putting his mask on the line against Psycho Clown, El Hijo del Fantasma and L.A. Park. On August 2, Pentagon teaming up L.A. Park defeating Psycho Clown and Pagano being his first victory after one year since his departure in January 2017.

Consejo Mundial de Lucha Libre (2018–2019) 
In the spring of 2018 Penta El 0M wrestled against Carístico on the Mexican independent circuit, after which he threatened Carístico that he would "visit Carístico's home", making references to the Consejo Mundial de Lucha Libre promotion. On June 29, 2018, Penta El 0M made a surprise appearance during the main event of CMLL's Super Viernes show, attacking Carístico during the match.

All Elite Wrestling (2019–present) 

During an independent circuit show in Georgia, The Young Bucks came to the ring to offer the Lucha Brothers an All Elite Wrestling (AEW) contract in a confrontation that ended with a verbal agreement and a handshake. It was subsequently revealed that Pentagon Jr. and Rey Fénix had agreed to a non-exclusive deal with AEW, due to their legal obligations to Lucha Underground. On February 7, 2019, at the All Elite Wrestling Ticket Announcement held at the MGM Grand Pool Splash, in Las Vegas, Nevada. The Young Bucks were leaving the stage as The Lucha Brothers music played seeing Pentagón Jr., and Fénix making their first appearance with the company. The two teams faced off before a brawl ensued seeing Pentagón striking Matt Jackson first, while Fénix took out Nick Jackson with a super-kick.  Pentagón then proceeded to package-piledrive Matt Jackson on the stage, before cutting promos and advertising themselves for the upcoming debut Pay-Per-View for the company, Double Or Nothing before exiting the stage. At Double Or Nothing, Pentagón Jr and his partner Fénix lost their AAA World Tag Team Championship to The Young Bucks. They won back the titles in a rematch organized by AAA at Verano de Escándalo. This led to a six-man tag match at AEW Fyter Fest, where the Lucha Brothers teamed with Laredo Kid in another losing effort against The Young Bucks and Kenny Omega. On the October 30, 2019 episode of AEW Dynamite, the Lucha Brothers lost to SoCal Uncensored in the finals of a tournament to decide the first ever AEW World Tag Team Champions.

On March 4, 2020, the Lucha Brothers formed a trio along with Pac known as Death Triangle, confirming their heel turn in the process. They made their debut as a team against Joey Janela and the Private Party, defeating them. However, with Pac stuck in the U.K., due to travel restrictions, they then formed an alliance with Eddie Kingston as well as The Butcher and The Blade. On November 18, 2020, Penta and Fenix again turned face and revived their Death Triangle alliance with Pac after saving him during a beatdown from Kingston, Butcher and Blade. In August 2021, it was announced that the Lucha Brothers would take part in a four-team eliminator tournament for a shot at the AEW World Tag Team Championship, with the winner of the tournament facing The Young Bucks at All Out in a steel cage match. The Lucha Brothers defeated the Varsity Blonds on the August 25 edition of Dynamite, and they defeated Jurassic Express on the August 27 edition of Rampage to become number one contenders. They went on to defeat the Young Bucks at the All Out pay-per-view, winning the AEW World Tag Team Championship for the first time. The match was widely praised by critics as one of the greatest steel cage matches of all time, and one of the best matches in AEW's history. On October 16, 2021, on a special Saturday edition of AEW Dynamite Penta and Fenix lost their AAA World Tag Team Championship to FTR disguised as the fictitious luchador tag team Las Super Ranas. On the January 5, 2022 episode of Dynamite, Jurassic Express defeated the Lucha Brothers to win their first AEW World Tag Team Championship.

On the February 23, 2022 episode of Dynamite, he successfully teamed with Pac to defeat the Kings of the Black Throne (Brody King and Malakai Black). Prior to the match, he was accompanied to the ring by Alex Abrahantes, carried a shovel, donned a black hood with a full black ring attire and debuted the name "Penta Oscuro" (Dark Penta), a callback to his Lucha Underground gimmick "Pentagon Dark". At Revolution's buy-in show, Oscuro and Pac would team with Erick Redbeard in a trios match against the House of Black (now completed with Buddy Matthews), which they lost. On the September 7th, 2022 episode of Dynamite, he would win the recently vacated AEW World Trios Championship with Pac and Fénix, defeating Best Friends.

Championships and accomplishments 

All Elite Wrestling
AEW World Tag Team Championship (1 time) – with Rey Fénix
AEW World Trios Championship (1 time) – with Pac and Rey Fénix
 AEW World Tag Team Championship Eliminator Tournament (2021) – with Rey Fénix
 Dynamite Award (1 time)
 Best Tag Team Brawl (2022) – 
 AAW: Professional Wrestling Redefined
 AAW Heavyweight Championship (1 time)
 AAW Heritage Championship (1 time)
 AAW Tag Team Championship (1 time) – with Rey Fénix
 Fifth Triple Crown Champion
 CBS Sports
 Tag Team of the Year (2019) – 
 The Crash Lucha Libre
 The Crash Cruiserweight Championship (1 time)
 The Crash Tag Team Championship (1 time) – with The King
 Fight Club: PRO
 Dream Team Invitational (2019) – with Rey Fénix
 House of Glory
 HOG Tag Team Championship (1 time) – with Fénix
 Impact Wrestling
 Impact World Championship (1 time)
 Impact World Tag Team Championship (1 time) – with Fénix
 IMPACT Year End Awards (2 times)
 Finisher of the Year (2018) – Pentagon Driver
 Match of the Year (2018) vs. Sami Callihan at Slammiversary XVI
 Lucha Libre AAA Worldwide
 AAA Latin American Championship (1 time)
 AAA World Mixed Tag Team Championship (1 time) – with Sexy Star
 AAA World Tag Team Championship (3 times) – with Joe Líder (1) and Fénix (2)
 Lucha Fighter (Men 2020)
 Rey de Reyes (2016)
 Ruleta de la Muerte (2022)
 Rudo of the Year (2014, 2015)
Wrestler of the Year (2015)
 Lucha Underground
 Lucha Underground Gift of the Gods Championship (1 time)
 Lucha Underground Championship (2 times)
 Aztec Warfare IV
 Major League Wrestling
 MLW World Tag Team Championship (1 time) – with Rey Fénix
 Mexican Independent Circuit
 Mexican Strong Style Championship (1 time)
 WCW Intercontinental Championship (1 time)
 Perros del Mal Producciones
 Perros del Mal Light Heavyweight Championship (2 times)
 PCW Ultra
 PCW Heavyweight Championship (2 times)
 Pro Wrestling Guerrilla
 PWG World Tag Team Championship (1 time) – with Rey Fénix
 Pro Wrestling Illustrated
 Ranked No. 28 of the top 500 singles wrestlers in the PWI 500 in 2019
 Ranked No. 2 of the top 50 tag teams in the PWI Tag Team 50 in 2021 
 Wrestling Alliance Revolution
 WAR World Tag Team Championship (1 time) – with Rey Fénix
 Wrestling Superstar
 Wrestling Superstar World Submission Lucha Championship (1 time)
 Xtreme Mexican Wrestling
 XMW Tag Team Championship (1 time) – with Fénix
 Wrestling Observer Newsletter
 Tag Team of The Year (2019) – with Rey Fénix
 Pro Wrestling Match of the Year (2021) – with Rey Fénix

Luchas de Apuestas record

Footnotes

References

External links 

 
 Impact Wrestling profile
 

1985 births
21st-century professional wrestlers
All Elite Wrestling personnel
Expatriate professional wrestlers
Living people
Masked wrestlers
Mexican expatriate sportspeople in the United States
Mexican male professional wrestlers
Professional wrestlers from Mexico City
TNA World Heavyweight/Impact World Champions
TNA/Impact World Tag Team Champions
Unidentified wrestlers
AEW World Tag Team Champions
PWG World Tag Team Champions
AAA Latin American Champions
AAA World Tag Team Champions
AAA World Mixed Tag Team Champions
AEW World Trios Champions
MLW World Tag Team Champions
Lucha Underground Champions
Lucha Underground Gift of the Gods Champions
AAW Heavyweight Champions
AAW Heritage Champions
AAW Tag Team Champions